(April 1611 – May 11, 1652) was a Japanese daimyō of the Edo period, who ruled the Tokushima Domain.

He was the eldest son of Hachisuka Yoshishige.

Tadateru's court title was Awa no kami.

Family
 Father: Hachisuka Yoshishige
 Mother: Manhime (1592–1666)
 Wife: Reishoin (d.1655)
 Concubines:
 unknown maybe Commoner
 daughter of Takada Masaharu
 Children:
 Hachisuka Mitsutaka by Reishoin
 Hachisuka Takashige (1634-1707) by Reishoin
 Hachisuka Takanori (1642-1695) by daughter of Takada Masaharu
 Ishimatsu by unknown maybe Commoner
 Kiyohime married Inada Tanehide by unknown maybe Commoner
 Hachisuka Takayoshi (1643-1698) by unknown maybe Commoner

References

1611 births
1652 deaths
Daimyo
Hachisuka clan